Manuel Francisco Pavón Aycinena (30 January 1798 – 19 April 1855) was a conservative Guatemalan politician during the regime of General Rafael Carrera. He was influential in the founding of the government's executive branch and held several Cabinet offices during his career.

Biography 

Pavón Aycinena attended the Pontifical University of San Carlos Borromeo and participated in the war against Francisco Morazán under the command of the Governor of Guatemala, Mariano de Aycinena y Piñol as Lieutenant Colonel in the army. After his defeat, Aycinena was banished by Morazan. In his exile, Aycinena lived in Panama and the United States. He returned to Guatemala in 1837 when Rafael Carrera came to power.

Role in Rafael Carrera's government

Carrera Theater 

On August 6, 1832, Guatemalan Governor Mariano Galvez issued a decree to build a theater in the middle of Plaza Vieja. However, this theater was not built during Galvez's reign due to continuous political unrest.

In 1852, Juan Matheu and Pavón Aycinena presented Rafael Carrera with a plan to build the Carrera Theater.

Carrera declared President for life 

Shortly after Carrera became President in 1851, Pavón Aycinena began suffering from intestinal problems.  On May 5, 1853, he became so ill that was put in a hospice, though he briefly recovered. On October 25, 1854, at the initiative of Pavón Aycinena, Carrera was declared "supreme and perpetual leader of the nation" for life, with the power to choose his successor; Carrera served as President of Guatemala until he died on April 14, 1865.

Death 

In February 1855, while Pavón Aycinena was traveling in Escuintla, his health rapidly declined. He returned to Guatemala City on March 17, and on April 15, a priest was called to perform Pavón's Last Rites.  Pavón Aycinena named his cousins Pedro de Aycinena and Luis Batres Juarros as executors of his will.

Pavón Aycinena died in his home on April 19 1855, surrounded by his relatives and important ecclesiastic figures. His funeral service took place in the Cathedral of Guatemala City and he was buried in La Merced Church.

On 7 May 1855, Carrera commanded that a portrait of Pavón Aycinena be placed in the main room of the Presidential Palace. Carrera also granted Pavón Aycinena's widow a lifelong pension equivalent to half of her deceased husband's income, —the largest pension ever granted in Guatemala up to that point.

See also 
 
 
 
 Francisco Morazán
History of Guatemala
History of Central America

Notes and references

References

Bibliography

Notes 

1798 births
1855 deaths
Rafael Carrera
People from Guatemala City
Conservatism in Guatemala
Guatemalan people of Spanish descent
Universidad de San Carlos de Guatemala alumni
19th-century Guatemalan people
Guatemalan politicians
Members of the Aycinena family in Central America